Teams were U-20 teams

Group A







Group B







Group C

Head coach:  Carlos Dinis





See also
ACOLOP
Lusophony Games
2006 Lusophony Games
2009 Lusophony Games
Athletics at the 2006 Lusophony Games
Basketball at the 2006 Lusophony Games
Beach Volleyball at the 2006 Lusophony Games
Football at the 2006 Lusophony Games
Futsal at the 2006 Lusophony Games
Taekwondo at the 2006 Lusophony Games
Table Tennis at the 2006 Lusophony Games
Volleyball at the 2006 Lusophony Games

References

External links 
 

Squads